The SVT-40 (Samozaryadnaya Vintovka Tokareva, Obrazets 1940 goda, "Tokarev self-loading rifle, model of 1940", Russian: Самозарядная винтовка Токарева, образец 1940 года, often nicknamed "Sveta") is a Soviet semi-automatic battle rifle that saw widespread service during and after World War II. It was intended to be the new service rifle of the Soviet Red Army, but its production was disrupted by the German invasion in 1941, resulting in a change back to the Mosin–Nagant rifle for the duration of World War II. After the war, the Soviet Union adopted new rifles, such as the SKS and the AK-47.

History 
In the early 1930s, the Soviet Union requested the development of a semi-automatic rifle to replace the Mosin-Nagant, taking inspiration from the Mexican Mondragón rifle. The design was left up to two individuals, Sergei Simonov and Fedor Tokarev. Simonov, who had experience in developing the Fedorov Avtomat, created a prototype for the AVS-36 in 1931. The rifle was used during the Winter War but was removed from service in 1941 due to design flaws.

SVT-38 

In 1938, Tokarev's rifle was accepted for production, under the designation SVT-38 with hopes that it would become the new standard issue rifle of the Red Army. Ambitious production plans anticipated two million rifles per year by 1942. Production began at Tula Arsenal in July 1939 (production at Izhmash began in late 1939).

The SVT-38 is a gas-operated rifle with a short-stroke, spring-loaded piston above the barrel and a tilting bolt, a system that would later be used in the FN FAL. The SVT-38 was equipped with a bayonet and a 10-round detachable magazine. The receiver was open-top, which enabled reloading of the magazine using five-round Mosin–Nagant stripper clips. The sniper variant had an additional locking notch for a see-through scope mount and was equipped with a 3.5×21 PU telescopic sight.

The SVT-38 saw its combat debut in the 1939–1940 Winter War with Finland. The rifle had many design flaws, as its gas port was prone to fouling, the magazine would sometimes fall out during use, and it was inaccurate, only being effective up to 600m. Production of the SVT-38 was terminated in April 1940 after some 150,000 examples had been manufactured.

SVT-40

With the removal of the SVT-38 from service, an improved design, the SVT-40, entered production. It was a more refined, lighter design incorporating a modified, folding, magazine release. The hand guard was now of one-piece construction and the cleaning rod was housed under the barrel. Other changes were made to simplify manufacturing. Production of the improved version began in July 1940 at Tula and later at factories in Izhevsk and Podolsk. Production of the Mosin–Nagant M1891/30 bolt-action rifle continued and it remained the standard-issue rifle to Red Army troops, with the SVT-40 more often issued to non-commissioned officers and elite units like the naval infantry. Since these factories already had experience manufacturing the SVT-38, output increased quickly and an estimated 70,000 SVT-40s were produced in 1940.

By the time of Operation Barbarossa, the German invasion of the USSR in June 1941, the SVT-40 was already in widespread use by the Red Army. In a Soviet infantry division's table of organization and equipment, one-third of rifles were supposed to be SVTs, though in practice they seldom achieved this ratio. The first months of the war were disastrous for the Soviet Union; they lost hundreds of thousands of SVT-40s. To make up for this, the production of the Mosin–Nagant rifles was reintroduced. In contrast, the SVT was more difficult to manufacture, and troops with only rudimentary training had difficulty maintaining it. Submachine guns like the PPSh-41 had proven their value as simple, cheap, and effective weapons to supplement infantry firepower. This led to a gradual decline in SVT production. In 1941, over one million SVTs were produced but in 1942 Izhevsk arsenal was ordered to cease SVT production and switch back to the Mosin–Nagant 91/30. Only 264,000 SVTs were manufactured in 1942 and production continued to diminish until the order to cease production was finally given in January 1945. Total production of the SVT-38/40 was around 1,600,000 rifles, of which 51,710 were the SVT-40 sniper variant.

SVTs frequently suffered from vertical shot dispersion; the army reported that the rifles were of "flimsy construction and there were difficulties experienced in their repair and maintenance". The stock, made of Arctic Birch, was prone to cracking in the wrist from recoil. This was generally remedied by drilling and inserting one or two large industrial bolts horizontally into the stock just before the wrist meets the receiver.  Many rifles were also poorly seated in their stocks, letting the receiver shift on firing. This led to a field modification that selectively shimmed the stock with birch chips, usually around the receiver and in between where the wood stock meets the lower metal handguard. For a sniper rifle, this was unacceptable and production of the specialized sniper variant of the SVT was terminated in 1942. Milling scope rails in the receivers of standard SVT rifles was also discontinued. Other production changes included a new, simpler muzzle brake design with two vents per-side instead of the six on the original.

AVT-40 automatic rifle 
To supplement the Red Army's shortage of machine guns, an SVT version capable of full-automatic fire (designated the AVT-40) was ordered into production on 20 May 1942; the first batches reached the troops in July. It was externally similar to the SVT, but its modified safety also acted as a fire selector allowing for both semi-automatic and fully automatic fire modes. When fired automatically the rifle had a rate of fire of approximately 750 RPM, faster than even the DP machine gun which fired the same cartridge at 550 RPM. To better resist the stress of automatic fire, the AVT featured a slightly stouter stock made of hardwood usually distinguished with a large “A” engraved in it; surplus AVT stocks were later used on refurbished SVTs. In service, the AVT proved a disappointment: the automatic fire was largely uncontrollable, and the rifles often suffered breakages under the increased strain.(Documents discovered after the war indicated that during testing, under continuous Full Auto fire, an AVT-40's barrel would be "shot out", meaning the rifling in the barrel would be completely worn down, in as little as 200-250 rounds.) The use of the AVT's automatic fire mode was subsequently prohibited, and production of the rifle was relatively brief; none were made after the summer of 1943.

A shorter carbine version SKT-40 (СКТ-40) was designed in 1940 and was submitted to a competitive test with a design of Simonov in the same year; neither was accepted for service. Later, a prototype version chambered for the new, shorter, 7.62×39mm round was developed, but was not accepted for production. An assault rifle based on a scaled-down SVT with 7.62x41mm chambering called the AT-44 was also put into development, competing with the AS-44 design. It failed to be accepted for similar reliability issues as the AVT. A silenced variation was also experimented with, though it  too ended in failure.

SVTs outside of the Soviet Union
The first country outside the Soviet Union to employ the SVT was Finland, which captured some 2,700 SVT-38s during the Winter War, and over 15,000 SVTs during the Continuation War. The SVT saw extensive use in Finnish hands. The Finns even attempted to make their own clone of the SVT-38 designated Tapako, though only a prototype was ever conceived. The Finns would continue to experiment with producing their own SVT based rifles until the late 1950s with the introduction of the RK-62.Germany captured hundreds of thousands of SVTs from the Eastern Front. As the Germans were short of self-loading rifles themselves, SVT-38 and 40s, designated respectively as Selbstladegewehr 258(r) and Selbstladegewehr 259(r) by the Wehrmacht, saw widespread use in German hands against their former owners. The study of the SVT's gas-operated action also aided in the development of the German Gewehr 43 rifle.

During the 1940s, Switzerland began looking into equipping its military with semi-auto rifles. Although never officially adopted, W+F Bern produced an almost faithful clone of the SVT with 7.5 mm Swiss chambering and a 6-round magazine called the AK44.

Italy also produced at least one prototype loosely copying an SVT, which is extant in Beretta's collection, but its designation or exact details are unknown.

Post-war

After the war, SVTs were mostly withdrawn from service and refurbished in arsenals, then stored. In Soviet service, firearms like the SKS and the AK-47 as well as the later SVD made the SVT obsolete, and the rifle was generally out of service by 1955. Only a few SVTs were exported to Soviet allies and clients. The Korean People's Army reportedly received some before the Korean War. The Finnish Army retired the SVT in 1958, and about 7,500 rifles were sold to the United States civilian market through firearm importer Interarms. This marked the end of SVTs in regular service.

In the Soviet Union, some SVTs (without bayonets) were sold as civilian hunting rifles, although other SVTs were kept in storage until the 1990s, when many rifles were sold abroad, along with other surplus military firearms.

Users
 
 : 1st Czechoslovak Independent Brigade in the USSR
  Estonian partisans after World War 2
 : Captured from Soviet troops, AVT-40 version also used. Finnish captured SVT-38s, 40s and AVT-40s have a [SA] property stamp.

  Italian Partisans: Used examples captured from German soldiers
 : Lithuanian civil Police used captured SVT-40s during the German occupation.
 : Captured from Soviet troops, designated as Selbstladegewehr 259(r)
 : Polish Armed Forces in the East

Museum exhibits 
 One SVT-38 rifle, one SVT-40 rifle and one SKT-40 carbine are in the collection of Tula State Arms Museum in Tula Kremlin
3 SVT-40 rifles and one SKT-40 carbine are on display at the J.M. Davis Arms & Historical Museum in Claremore, Oklahoma

See also 
 AVS-36
 FG 42
 Gewehr 43
 M1 Garand
 M1941 Johnson rifle
 SKS
 List of Russian weaponry

Notes

External links

 History and technicalities of the SVT-40
 SVT-40 Pictorial
 СВТ трудная судьба, Kalashnikov magazine, 2001/6, pp. 50–56

7.62×54mmR battle rifles
7.62×54mmR semi-automatic rifles
Short stroke piston firearms
Tula Arms Plant products
Semi-automatic rifles of the Soviet Union
World War II battle rifles
World War II semi-automatic rifles
World War II infantry weapons of the Soviet Union
Weapons and ammunition introduced in 1940